Netherlands is a nation that has competed at the Hopman Cup tournament on eight occasions, their first appearance coming at the 2nd annual staging of the event in 1990. They have been runner-up in one tournament  in  2006.

Players
This is a list of players who have played for the Netherlands at the Hopman Cup.

References

Hopman Cup teams
Hopman Cup
Hopman Cup